The Defence Act of 2000 (prop. 1999/2000:30) was a defence act passed by the Swedish Riksdag on 30 March 2000, and the largest reorganisation of the Swedish Armed Forces since the Defence Act of 1925. The act was a continuation of the policies set in motion by the Defence Act of 1996: shifting the military's focus from the defence of Swedish territory to a more flexible "operational defence* (Swedish: insatsförsvar) for smaller-scale peacekeeping operations in foreign nations. Many military formations were disbanded as a result.

Summary 
The future organisation decided by the Act included, up until 2004, the following military units:

 A headquarters, an operational command, and four military district commands.
 An army divisional command, formed of an NBC task force and two rifle battalions.
 6 army brigade commands, 16 mechanised battalions, 4 air defence battalions, 4 howitzer battalions, 4 pioneer battalions, 4 maintenance battalions, 6 urban warfare battalions and 1 battalion of paratroopers.
 2 surface flotillas with a combined total of 12 surface vessels.
 1 submarine flotilla with 5 submarines.
 A minesweeper flotilla.
 An amphibious brigade command and 3 amphibious battalions.
 8 divisions of JAS 39 jets.
 2 helicopter battalions, one with a focus on ground operations and another with a focus on naval operations.
 National Defence Troops, including among others 12 ground combat battalions and elements of the Home Guard.

Disbanded units, commands and academies

Armed Forces Commands 
Military districts (Militärområden)
 Milo N - Northern Military District, Boden.
 Milo M - Middle Military District, Strängnäs.
 Milo S - Southern Military District, Kristianstad.
 MKG - Gotland Military Command, Visby.
Divisions
 Eastern Army Division, Strängnäs.
 Northern Army Division, Boden.
 Southern Army Division, Kristianstad
Service Branch Commands (försvarsgrensstaber)
 AC - Army Center, Enköping.
 FC - Air Force Center, Uppsala.
 MC - Navy Center, Haninge/Berga.

Army 
Infantry regiments
 I 1 - Svea Life Guards, Upplands-Bro. (Reorganised into the Life Guards)
 I 2 - Värmland Regiment, Kristinehamn. 
 I 3 - Life Regiment Grenadiers, Örebro.
 I 12 - Småland Regiment, Eksjö. 
 I 13 - Dalarna Regiment, Falun.
 I 16 - Halland Regiment, Halmstad. 
 I 20 - Västerbotten Regiment, Umeå.
 I 21 - Västernorrland Regiment, Sollefteå. 
 I 22 - Lapland Ranger Regiment, Kiruna. 
Infantry Brigades/Norrland Brigades
 IB 1 - Life Guard Brigade, Upplands-Bro.
 IB 2 - Värmland Brigade, Kristinehamn. 
 NB 5 - Field Rifle Brigade, Östersund. (Reorganised into I 5 Field Rifle Regiment) 
 IB 12 - Småland Brigade, Eksjö.
 NB 13 - Dala Brigade, Falun.
 IB 16 - Halland Brigade, Halmstad.
 NB 21 - Ångermanland Brigade, Sollefteå.
Cavalry
 K 1 - Life Guard Dragoons, Stockholm. (Today part of LG - Life Guards)
Armoured troops
 P 2 - Scanian Dragoon Regiment, Hässleholm. 
Mechanised brigades
 MekB 7 - Southern Scanian Brigade, Revingehed.
 MekB 8 - Scanian Dragoon Brigade, Hässleholm.
 MekB 9 - Skaraborg Brigade, Skövde.
 MekB 10 - Södermanland Brigade, Strängnäs.
 MekB 18 - Gotland Brigade, Visby.
 MekB 19 - Norrbotten Brigade, Boden.
Artillery
 ArtSS - Artillery Combat School, Kristinehamn. (Today part of the Artillery Regiment)
 A 3 - Wendes Artillery Regiment, Hässleholm.
 A 7 - Gotland Artillery Regiment, Visby.
 A 8 - Norrland Artillery Regiment, Boden. (Today a battalion of the Norrbotten Regiment)
 A 9 - Bergslagen Artillery Regiment, Kristinehamn. (Reorganised into the Artillery Regiment)
Air Defence troops
 LvSS - Air Defence Combat School, Norrtälje. (Relocated to Halmstad and part of the Air Defence Regiment).
 Lv 2 - Gotland Anti-Aircraft Corps, Visby.
 Lv 3 - Roslagen Anti-Aircraft Corps, Norrtälje.
 Lv 6 - Göta Anti-Aircraft Corps, Halmstad. (Reorganised into the Air Defence Regiment)
 Lv 7 - Norrland Anti-Aircraft Corps, Luleå. (Today part of the Norrbotten Regiment)
Combat engineers
 Ing 3 - Boden Engineer Regiment, Boden. (Today a battalion of the Norrbotten Regiment)
Signal troops
 S 3 - Norrland Signal Regiment, Boden. (Today a battalion of the Norrbotten Regiment)
 Army Service Troops (trängtrupperna)
 T 2 - Göta Logistic Corps, Skövde. (Reorganised into Göta Logistic Regiment)
 T 3 - Norrland Logistic Corps, Boden. (Today a battalion of the Norrbotten Regiment)

Air Force 
 FKN - Northern Air Command, Luleå.
 FKM - Middle Air Command, Upplands-Bro.
 FKS - Southern Air Command, Ängelholm.
 F 10 - Scania Wing. (Disbanded by 2002)
 F 16 - Uppland Wing. (Disbanded by 2004)
 1. hkpbat - Norrland Helicopter Battalion, Boden. (Reorganised into a squadron)
 3. hkpbat - Göta Helicopter Battalion, Säve. (Reorganised into a squadron)

Navy 
 MKN - Norrland Coast Naval Command, Härnösand.
 MKO - East Coast Naval Command, Haninge/Muskö.
 MKS - South Coast Naval Command, Karlskrona.
 MKV - West Coast Naval Command, Gothenburg.
 KA 1 - Vaxholm Coastal Artillery Regiment. (Reorganised into Amf 1)
 KA 2 - Karlskrona Coastal Artillery Regiment. 
 KA 3 - Gotland Coastal Artillery Regiment. 
 KA 4 - Älvsborg Coastal Artillery Regiment. (Reorganised into Amf 4)

Defence districts (försvarsområden)

Established units, commands and academies

Armed Forces Commands 
 ATK - Army Tactical Command, Uppsala.
 FTK - Air Force Tactical Command, Uppsala.
 MTK - Naval Tactical Command, Uppsala.
 OPIL - Joint Forces Command, Uppsala.
 1. Mekdiv - Mechanised Division, Stockholm.

Army 
Artillery
 A 9 - Artillery Regiment, Kristinehamn (in 2005 moved to Boden).
Infantry/Cavalry
 LG - Life Guards, Kungsängen/Upplands-Bro.
 I 19 - Norrbotten Regiment, Boden.  
 P 4 - Skaraborg Regiment, Skövde. 
 P 7 - South Scanian Regiment, Revingehed/Lund.

Navy 
Fleet
 MarinB O - East Coast Naval Base, Muskö.
 MarinB S - South Coast Naval Base, Karlskrona.
 2.ysflj - Second Surface Combat Flotilla, Berga.
Amphibious Corps
 Amf 1 - Vaxholm Amphibian Regiment, Vaxholm.
 Amf 4 - Älvsborg Amphibian Regiment, Gothenburg.
 AmfSS - Amphibious Combat School, Vaxholm.

Military districts 
 MD N - Northern Military District, Boden.
 MD M - Central Military District, Strängnäs.
 MD S - Southern Military District, Gothenburg.
 MD G - Gotland Military District, Visby.

Military district groups

Footnotes

References

Further reading

External links 
 Regeringens proposition 1999/2000:30-Det nya försvaret - Sveriges Riksdag
 "Regeringens proposition 1999/2000:97-Vissa organisatoriska frågor inom Försvarsmakten" - Sveriges Riksdag

2000 in Sweden
2000 in politics
Defence Acts of Sweden